José Vicente León (born 17 November 1943) is a Spanish former swimmer. He competed in the men's 200 metre butterfly at the 1960 Summer Olympics.

References

External links
 

1943 births
Living people
Spanish male butterfly swimmers
Olympic swimmers of Spain
Swimmers at the 1960 Summer Olympics
People from San Cristóbal de La Laguna
Sportspeople from the Province of Santa Cruz de Tenerife
Swimmers at the 1959 Mediterranean Games